De'an is a county under the jurisdiction of the prefecture-level city of Jiujiang in the north of Jiangxi Province, China. This county is known for the residence of the parents of film director Ang Lee.

Administrative divisions
De'an County is divided to 4 towns and 9 townships.
4 towns

9 townships

Climate

See also
De'an Railway Station
Nanchang–Jiujiang Intercity Railway

References

External links
Official website of De'an County government

 
County-level divisions of Jiangxi
Jiujiang